The Nightmare Room is an American children's anthology horror series that aired on Kids' WB. The series was based on the short-lived children's book series that went by the same title created by Goosebumps author, R. L. Stine. The Nightmare Room originally aired from August 31, 2001, to March 16, 2002, in the United States.

Premise
The Nightmare Room is based on fears that children have, such as ghosts and monsters, which normally ended with comments by the narrator whose final words always ended with the words "the nightmare room", then a door with The Nightmare Room logo appeared, closing. In many instances, the series resembled the television series The Twilight Zone with teens taking the role as the main characters, many of whom portrayed the characters were popular child actors at the time, including Amanda Bynes, Frankie Muniz, Justin Berfield, Drake Bell, Brenda Song, Lindsey Felton, Shia LaBeouf, Kaley Cuoco,  Dylan and Cole Sprouse. In addition, David Naughton, Robert Englund (famously known as Freddy Krueger from the Nightmare on Elm Street films), Betsy Randle, Tippi Hedren, David Carradine, and Angus Scrimm also worked on some episodes.

The Nightmare Room is Kids' WB's only live-action show. The show was produced by Parachute Entertainment, Tollin/Robbins Productions, and Warner Bros. Television.

Book titles and summaries
Don't Forget Me: Danielle Warner and her brother Peter move into a house where the basement is haunted by the ghosts of children who have been forgotten by their friends and families. They lure living children in by making their friends and families forget about them.
Locker 13: Superstitious Luke Green gets assigned Locker #13 on his first day of school and tries to quell the bad luck that goes along with it by finding a good-luck charm. But the good-luck charm has a twisted secret of its own.
My Name is Evil: A carnival fortune teller accuses Maggie of being evil. Maggie brushes it off as a joke — until accidents occur in school and all signs point to Maggie as a suspect.
Liar, Liar: Years of lying suddenly catch up with Ross when he finds himself in a parallel world where an evil twin tells him that he will die in two days.
Dear Diary, I'm Dead: Alex Smith discovers a diary in his room that predicts the future, including his death.
They Call Me Creature: Laura must find out why the animals she cares for are attacking her and what her father is doing in the backyard shed.
The Howler: Self-proclaimed electronics geek Spencer Turner buys a machine called "The Howler" that lets humans communicate with the dead... and summons a ghost family who want to kill his friends and family.
Shadow Girl: A bored girl named Selena discovers that she is really a superheroine named Shadow Girl, and, like all superheroes, has an arch-enemy who wants her dead.
Camp Nowhere: At summer camp, Russell rows over Forbidden Falls — and finds himself in a summer camp haunted by the ghost of an evil Native American spirit.
Full Moon Halloween: It's a frightful Halloween night as a teacher gets four of his students and tries to discover that one of them may be a werewolf.
Scare School: Sam is haunted by an imp at his new school who preys on new students.
Visitors: UFO enthusiast Ben Shipley discovers that aliens are covertly invading Earth.

The Nightmare Room Thrillogy
Fear Games: Twelve kids with special abilities have been selected to take part in a reality show called Life Games, set on an island haunted by a psychotic witch.
What Scares You the Most?: April (one of the contestants) is stranded on the island and must fight her biggest fears in order to escape.
No Survivors: After her escape in What Scares You the Most?, April must return to the haunted island in order to rid it of the witch's spirits.

Opening narration
At the beginning of each episode, R. L. Stine gives an opening monologue of sorts — in a manner very similar to Rod Serling's iconic opening narration for The Twilight Zone — that acts somewhat like a theme song for the series.

Despite the claim of being R. L. Stine, the narration was provided by James Avery of The Fresh Prince of Bel-Air fame. Avery also did the closing narration for each episode.

Episodes

Releases
On August 20, 2002, 8 episodes were released on 2 DVD volumes. 5 episodes remain unreleased.

Awards and nominations

References

External links
 
 

2000s American children's television series
2000s American horror television series
2001 American television series debuts
2002 American television series endings
2000s American anthology television series
American children's fantasy television series
English-language television shows
Horror anthologies
Kids' WB original shows
R. L. Stine
American television shows based on children's books
Television shows based on American novels
Television series by Warner Bros. Television Studios
Television series about bullying
Television series about revenge
Television series about teenagers
Alien invasions in television
Kidnapping in television
Television about werewolves